Caladium lindenii is a species of flowering plant in the family Araceae, named after Belgian botanist Jean Jules Linden.

Cultivation
Cultivars include Caladium lindenii 'Magnificum'.

References

Madison, Selbyana 5: 373 (1981).

lindenii
House plants
Taxa named by Édouard André